Char Chapori (Assamese: চৰ চাপৰি) is an area of Brahmaputra river and its tributaries in the Indian state Assam constitution of flood plain sediments. According to the Assam Government record, the Char Chapori covers 3,608 km2 of the Brahmaputra basin, or 4.6% of Assam's area.

Problems
The people of Char Chapori face a certain number of problems including soil erosion, over flooding, illiteracy, high population growth and organised hate crime against them.

Population
Char Chapori bears maximum numbers of Minority Muslim .

References

External links
 Char Chapori, Assam 

Environment of Assam
Geography of Assam
Brahmaputra River